Eucyclogobius is a genus of fish in the family Gobiidae endemic to California in United States.

Species
There are currently 2 recognized species in this genus:
 Eucyclogobius kristinae Swift, Spies, Ellingson & Jacobs, 2016 (Southern tide-water goby) 
 Eucyclogobius newberryi (Girard, 1856) (Northern tide-water goby)

References

Gobionellinae
Taxa named by Theodore Gill